|}

The Hackwood Stakes is a Group 3 flat horse race in Great Britain open to thoroughbreds aged three years or older. It is run at Newbury over a distance of 6 furlongs (1,207 metres), and it is scheduled to take place each year in July.

The event was promoted to Group 3 status in 2006, having been classed previously at Listed level. It was sponsored by Shadwell Racing from 2009 to 2011. In 2012 it was sponsored by Chrisbeekracing.com and run as the Chrisbeekracing.com Stakes. It has been sponsored since 2016 by Bet365.

The Hackwood Stakes is currently held on the second day of Newbury's Summer Festival meeting, the same day as the Weatherbys Super Sprint.

Records
Most successful horse since 1986:
 no horse has won this race more than once since 1986

Leading jockey since 1986 (4 wins):
 Pat Eddery – Interval (1987), Lake Coniston (1994), Hattab (1997), Invincible Spirit (2001)
 Jim Crowley -  Strath Burn (2015), Yafta (2018), Tabdeed (2020), Minzaal (2022) 

Leading trainer since 1986 (3 wins):
 James Fanshawe – La Grange Music (1990), Deacon Blues (2011), The Tin Man (2016)

Winners since 1986

See also
 Horse racing in Great Britain
 List of British flat horse races

References
 Paris-Turf:
 Racing Post:

 galopp-sieger.de – Hackwood Stakes.
 horseracingintfed.com – International Federation of Horseracing Authorities – Hackwood Stakes (2019).
 pedigreequery.com – Hackwood Stakes – Newbury.

Flat races in Great Britain
Newbury Racecourse
Open sprint category horse races